Mylochromis gracilis, known as the happy or the Haplochromis torpedo stripe (in aquarium trade), is a species of cichlid endemic to Lake Malawi where it is only known from sandy areas in the southern end of the lake.  This species can reach a length of  TL.

References

gracilis
Fish of Lake Malawi
Fish of Malawi
Fish described in 1935
Taxonomy articles created by Polbot